Isle of Hope United Methodist Church is a United Methodist church in Savannah, Georgia, United States.

Founded in 1851, this church has grown to have more than 2,800 members. Offers ministry opportunities for all ages and stages, with special emphasis on Christian Education and Missions.

Isle of Hope UMC offers two Sunday morning worship services: traditional worship in the Sanctuary at 9:15 AM, and The Anchor, a modern worship experience at 9:15 AM in the Ministry Center.

United Methodist churches in Georgia (U.S. state)
Buildings and structures in Chatham County, Georgia
1851 establishments in Georgia (U.S. state)